BSES Yamuna Power Limited (BYPL) is a joint venture between the Government of Delhi and  Reliance Infrastructure Limited, which holds a 51% majority stake in the venture. It is one of the three electricity distribution companies in Delhi, the other two being BSES Rajdhani Power Limited and  Tata Power Delhi Distribution Limited. BYPL started operations in July 2002 and currently serves 1.65 million  people in the Central and East parts of Delhi.

It distributes power to 14 divisions across Central & East Delhi areas including Chandni Chowk, Darya Ganj, Dilshad Garden, Jhilmil, Karawal Nagar, Krishna Nagar, Laxmi Nagar, Mayur Vihar, Vasundhara Enclave, Nandnagri, Pahar Ganj, Patel Nagar, Shankar Road, and Yamuna Vihar.

Origins

In 2002, the distribution network of the erstwhile Delhi Vidyut Board was privatised as per the provisions of the Delhi Electricity Reform Act, 2000 and the Delhi Electricity Reform (Transfer Scheme) Rules, 2001. The Delhi Vidyut Board was unbundled and split into six entities and i.e. Delhi Power Company Limited (holding company), Indraprastha Power Generation Company, Delhi Transco Limited, BSES Rajdhani Power Limited, BSES Yamuna Power Limited and North Delhi Power Limited (now Tata Power Delhi Distribution Limited).

e-Vehicle charging 
Deputy Chief Minister of Delhi, Manish Sisodia inaugurated the first public e-vehicle charging station of Delhi in his Patparganj constituency on 18 July 2020.  The e-vehicle charging station is set up under a partnership between BSES Yamuna Power Limited and EV Motors India Private Limited. The Patparganj station can charge four vehicles at a time, in 45 to 90 minutes, depending on the vehicle type.

References

Electric power transmission system operators in India
Reliance Group
2001 establishments in Delhi
Energy companies established in 2001
Indian companies established in 2001